Miguel Ángel Martínez (born 16 February 1995) is a Spanish footballer who plays as a goalkeeper for Italian  club Pordenone.

CLub career
In 2014, Ángel Martínez almost joined the first team of Spanish La Liga side Getafe but left due to injury.

In 2016, he signed for Catania in the Italian third division after playing for the English Nike Academy.

In 2018, he signed for Spanish fourth division club CF San Agustín del Guadalix, before returning to Catania.

Ángel Martínez, his mother and his sister are directors of Chamartín Vergara in Spain.

On 20 July 2021, he joined Serie C club Triestina.

On 18 August 2022, Ángel Martínez signed a one-year contract with Pordenone.

References

External links
 
 

1995 births
Living people
Footballers from the Community of Madrid
Spanish footballers
Association football goalkeepers
Serie C players
Catania S.S.D. players
U.S. Triestina Calcio 1918 players
Pordenone Calcio players
Tercera División players
Spanish expatriate footballers
Expatriate footballers in Italy
Expatriate footballers in England
Spanish expatriate sportspeople in Italy
Spanish expatriate sportspeople in England